Metabacterium polyspora is an unusual multiple endospore-producing bacterium isolated from the cecum of guinea pigs. This bacterium is physically similar to the phylogenetically related surgeonfish intestinal symbiont Epulopiscium fishelsoni.

References

Further reading

Eubacteriales
Bacteria genera